The 2017–18 Formula 4 South East Asia Championship season was the second season of the Formula 4 South East Asia Championship. It began on 30 September 2017 at the Sepang International Circuit and finished on 15 April 2018 at the same venue, after 29 races held across five rounds on three countries.

Drivers

Race calendar and results

The final calendar was released on 4 July 2017. The first round at Sepang will be held in support the 2017 Malaysian Grand Prix, whereas the two final rounds in Buriram and Sepang will support the 2017–18 Asian Le Mans Series.

Due to an incident involving F1 driver Romain Grosjean, which required track fixing operations, the first race of the opening Sepang round had to be postponed. It was announced later that the round will be shortened to 5 races, with the sixth race being rescheduled at a later date.

On November 20, organizers cancelled round 3 at the Sentul International Circuit in Indonesia due lo logistical complications. It was later announced that the round would be rescheduled at Buriram for early December, and finally at Sepang for mid April as the season finale.

Championship standings

The series follows the standard F1 points scoring system with the addition of 1 point for fastest lap and 3 points for pole. The best 24 results out of 30 races counted towards the championship.

The first and second fastest qualifying laps determine grid positions for race 1 and race 4 (In the opening round at Sepang for race 3 instead of race 4 due to cancelling of the race).  The fastest laps in race 1 determine the grid positions for race 2, while the grid positions for race 3 are created by the finishing positions of race 2 with top half of the grid reversed.  race 4 grid positions based on the drivers’ second fastest qualifying laps, while race 5 start is determined by the fastest laps of race 4 and the grid positions of race 6 are the finishing positions of race 5, with the top half of the grid reversed.

Due to miscalculation of the fuel level, no cars were able to finish full race distance of the third race in the opening round of the season at Sepang because of lack of petrol. The classification was declared after five race laps.

Points were awarded as follows:

Drivers' standings

Rookie Cup

References

External links 

 

South East Asia
Formula 4 South East Asia Championship
South East Asia
Formula 4 South East Asia Championship
Formula 4 South East Asia Championship
South East Asia F4
South East Asia F4
2017 in Malaysian motorsport
2018 in Malaysian motorsport